The Walsh Barn on the Lausser-Hayes Ranch near Spearfish, South Dakota was built in 1907. It was listed on the National Register of Historic Places in 2003.

It is built of sandstone quarried from the Redwater River, which runs nearby.  It was built "in 1907 by Irish immigrant Maurice Walsh, his wife Mary and their daughters Mary age 16, Nellie age 14, Florence age 10, and Margaret age 7 at the time."  Walsh came to the Black Hills area during the 1876 gold rush.

It has features similar to German Grundscheier barns of the eastern Midwest and Eastern states.

References

Barns in South Dakota
National Register of Historic Places in South Dakota
Buildings and structures completed in 1907
Lawrence County, South Dakota